La Modelo de la calle Florida is a 1939  Argentine low budget musical film directed by Julio Irigoyen. The tango film premiered in Buenos Aires.

External links

1939 films
1930s Spanish-language films
Argentine black-and-white films
Tango films
Films directed by Julio Irigoyen
1939 musical films
Films set in Buenos Aires
Argentine musical films
1930s Argentine films